The 2017–18 West Midlands (Regional) League season was the 118th in the history of the West Midlands (Regional) League, an English association football competition for semi-professional and amateur teams based in the West Midlands county, Shropshire, Herefordshire, Worcestershire and southern Staffordshire. The league operates three divisions: the Premier Division, see below, at level 10 in the English football league system, Division One at level 11, and Division Two. The Premier Division is one of three divisions which feed into the Midland League Premier Division, the other two being the East Midlands Counties League and the Midland League's own Division One.

The constitution for Step 5 and Step 6 divisions for 2017–18 was announced on 26 May 2017, and following one amendment, the WMRC Premier Division constitution was ratified at the league's AGM on 26 Jun.

Premier Division

The Premier Division featured 17 clubs which competed in the division last season, along with three new clubs:
 Hereford Lads Club, promoted from Division One 
 Tividale, relegated from the Midland Football League
 Wednesfield, promoted from Division One

League table

References

External links
 West Midlands (Regional) League

2017-18
10